The following units and commanders fought at the Battle of Schellenberg on July 2, 1704.

Allied army
 Unless otherwise noted, all regiments had one battalion.

Left Wing
John Churchill, Duke of Marlborough

Advance Guard

Main Body

General Charles Churchill

Reserve

Artillery

Colonel Holcroft Blood
 twenty 3-pounders
 ten 9-pounders
 six 12-pounders
 four howitzers

Right Wing
Louis William, Margrave of Baden

Infantry
General Johann Karl Graf von Thüngen

Cavalry
General Hermann Otto II of Limburg Stirum (mw)

Franco-Bavarian Army
Jean Baptist, Comte d'Arco
Second in command: Alessandro, Marquis de Maffei

References

 Stanford, Ian, Ian Croxall, and Col. (Ret.) Bill Gray, "The Schellenberg 1704: Welcome to the War of Spanish Succession." Strategy & Tactics #243 (June 2007)

War of the Spanish Succession orders of battle